God's Pocket Marine Provincial Park is a provincial park in southwest British Columbia, Canada, established July 12, 1995. It is well known as a cold water scuba diving and kayaking destination. The park is 2,036 hectares in size, and includes two main islands, Hurst and Bell islands respectively, and many smaller isles.

References

BC Parks - God's Pocket Marine Provincial Park

Provincial parks of British Columbia
Central Coast of British Columbia
Marine parks of Canada